Anatoliy Anatolievich Guretskiy (born 18 March 1955 in Grigoriopol District, Moldavian SSR, Soviet Union) was the Minister of Justice in Transnistria from 2005 until 2009. 

He took over on 1 November 2005 from Viktor Alekseevich Balala. Guretskiy is a lawyer and a native-born Transnistrian from a village near Grigoriopol. Guretskiy was replaced by Sergei Mikhailovich Stepanov on 22 April 2009.

References

1955 births
Living people
People from Grigoriopol District
Transnistrian politicians